Hippocampus bargibanti, also known as Bargibant's seahorse or the pygmy seahorse, is a seahorse of the family Syngnathidae found in the central Indo-Pacific area.

There are two known color variations: grey with red tubercles, and yellow with orange tubercles. It is unknown whether these color varieties are linked to specific host gorgonians (corals).

Description 
The pygmy seahorse is well camouflaged and extremely difficult to spot amongst the gorgonian coral it inhabits. So effective is this camouflage that the species wasn't actually discovered until its host gorgonian was being examined in a laboratory. In 1969, a New Caledonian scientist, Georges Bargibant, was collecting specimens of Muricella gorgonians for the Nouméa museum and whilst one of these was on his dissection table he happened to notice a pair of tiny seahorses. The next year they were officially named by Whitley as "Bargibant's pygmy seahorse." Large, bulbous tubercles cover its body and match the colour and shape of the polyps of its host species of gorgonian coral, while its body matches the gorgonian stem. It is not known whether individuals can change colour if they change hosts, although the ability to change colour according to their surroundings does exist in some other seahorse species, such as Hippocampus whitei. Other distinctive pygmy seahorse characteristics include a fleshy head and body, a very short snout, and a long, prehensile tail.

Distribution 

Reproduction 
Adults are usually found in pairs or clusters of pairs, with up to 28 pygmy seahorses recorded on a single gorgonian, and may be monogamous. As with other seahorses, the male carries the young. Breeding occurs year-round. The female lays her eggs in a brood pouch in his trunk region. They are fertilized by the male, and incubated until birth with gestation averaging two weeks. In one birth witnessed underwater, a male expelled a brood of 34 live young. The young or fry look like miniature adults, are independent from birth, and receive no further parental care. The fry are dark.

Conservation 
Very little is known about the total number of pygmy seahorses, population trends, distribution, or major threats. It has therefore been classified as Data Deficient on the International Union for Conservation of Nature's Red List. Because of the unusual and attractive colouration of this small seahorse, it is possible that it could be being collected for the aquaria trade, although no international trade in the species has been recorded. Under the care of experienced researchers at national aquaria, all pygmy seahorses and their gorgonians have died.

All seahorses (Hippocampus spp.) are listed on Appendix II of the Convention on the International Trade in Endangered Species of Wild Flora and Fauna (CITES), effective as of May 2004, limiting and regulating their international trade. Australian populations of pygmy seahorses are listed under the Australian Wildlife Protection Act, so that export permits are now required, although they are only granted for approved management plans or captive-bred animals. With such limited data available, there is an urgent need for further research to be conducted on its biology, ecology, habitat, abundance and distribution, before its status can be properly assessed and conservation measures implemented accordingly. However, the remarkably effective camouflage of this species may make such surveys particularly challenging.

Naming 
The specific name honours Georges Bargibant, a technician of Centre ORSTOM of Nouméa, New Caledonia.

References

External links 

 
 Hippocampus bargibanti at Tropical Favourites
 National Geographic video of Hippocampus bargibanti
 Resource for Pygmy Seahorses
 iSeahorse
 IUCN Seahorse, Pipefish & Stickleback Specialist Group
 

Bargibanti
Taxa named by Gilbert Percy Whitley
Fish described in 1970